The Wilderness House Literary Review is an American quarterly online literary magazine, based in Littleton, Massachusetts. The magazine was launched in 2006. It has published authors such as DeWitt Henry – a founding editor of Ploughshares – A. D. Winans, Lyn Lifshin, Mitchell Waldman, and Hugh Fox – one of the founding members of the Pushcart Prize and the first writer to publish a critical study on the work of Charles Bukowski.

An interview with Robert Whiting, author of Tokyo Underworld, appeared in the autumn 2012 edition.

Steve Glines publishes and edits the magazine.

See also

 List of literary magazines
 List of United States magazines

References

External links
 

2006 establishments in Massachusetts
Companies based in Middlesex County, Massachusetts
Littleton, Massachusetts
Magazines established in 2006
Magazines published in Massachusetts
Mass media in Middlesex County, Massachusetts
Online literary magazines published in the United States
Quarterly magazines published in the United States